The 2020 United States presidential election in Texas was held on Tuesday, November 3, 2020, as part of the 2020 United States presidential election in which all 50 states plus the District of Columbia 
participated. Texan voters chose 38 electors to represent them in the Electoral College. In a popular vote the Republican Party's nominee, incumbent President Donald Trump, and running mate Vice President Mike Pence won all the electors against the Democratic Party's nominee, former Vice President Joe Biden, and his running mate California Senator Kamala Harris.

Although it was considered a vulnerable state for Trump by some pollsters and experts and a potential upset victory for Biden due to its recent demographic trends, Trump held Texas with 52.1% of the vote, roughly the same percentage he carried it with in 2016. Biden improved on Hillary Clinton's 2016 vote share by 3.24%, giving him the largest percentage in the state by a Democratic presidential candidate since Jimmy Carter carried the state in 1976. Trump's 5.58% margin of victory was also the narrowest for a Republican since 1996. Texas was the third-narrowest of Trump's state victories, behind only Florida and North Carolina, and the ninth-closest state overall. The election was also the first time Texas placed in the top ten closest states since 1968, and the first time since 1976 that Texas voted to the left of Ohio. As in most other states in 2020, Trump significantly outperformed his polling. Voter turnout in the state increased to its highest level since 1992, when two Texans, George H. W. Bush and Ross Perot, were on the ballot.

Primary elections

Republican primary

The Republican primary was held on March 3, 2020. Donald Trump and Bill Weld were the only declared Republican candidates, as former South Carolina Governor and U.S. Representative Mark Sanford and U.S. Representative Joe Walsh had dropped out. Texas Governor Greg Abbott declined to run against Trump, as did 2016 Republican primary candidate and current senator Ted Cruz. The primary was won overwhelmingly by Trump with over 94% of the vote.

Democratic primary

The Democratic primary was held on March 3, 2020. Elizabeth Warren, Bernie Sanders, Michael Bloomberg and Joe Biden were among the major declared candidates. The primary was won by Biden, with Sanders coming second.

General election

Final predictions

Polling

Graphical summary

Aggregate polls

Polls

Donald Trump vs. Bernie Sanders

Donald Trump vs. Elizabeth Warren

Donald Trump vs. Michael Bloomberg

Donald Trump vs. Amy Klobuchar

Donald Trump vs. Pete Buttigieg

Donald Trump vs. Tom Steyer

Donald Trump vs. Andrew Yang

Donald Trump vs. Cory Booker

with Donald Trump and Julian Castro

with Donald Trump and Kamala Harris

with Donald Trump and Beto O'Rourke

with Donald Trump and Mark Cuban

with Donald Trump and a Generic Democrat

with Donald Trump and a generic opponent

Voting access 
Matters of election administration and ease of voting during an ongoing pandemic were heavily litigated in Texas in 2020. Harris County, the most populous one in Texas, spearheaded a number of innovative approaches and was the focal point of several legal challenges. 

For the 2020 elections, Harris County Commissioners approved a budget of $33 million, higher than the $4 million budget for the 2016 United States presidential election. Chris Hollins, the interim Harris County Clerk and Texas Democratic Party finance vice chairperson, created a 23-point voting access expansion program, which included promotion of voting by mail, expansion of early voting accessibility, and drive-through voting, an innovation to facilitate voting while at the same time mitigating infection risks during the COVID-19 pandemic. On October 29 several voting locations in Harris County were available for 24 hours to accommodate voters whose work shifts or other responsibilities overlapped with regular voting hours.

Local Republican activists and officials challenged the voter-friendly measures in multiple legal actions, with mixed success. Several lawsuits complained about early voting and about Harris County providing multiple drop-off locations for absentee ballots. Responding to pressure from within his own party, Governor Abbott then restricted the number of drop-offs to a single one per county regardless of population and size, forcing Harris County to close eleven sites at county clerk branch offices called annexes. 

When a legal action challenging drive-through voting was dismissed, the Republican Party in Texas sought relief in the Texas Supreme Court (SCOTX), which denied the petition because the case had not been brought promptly. The first lawsuit was filed on October 15 even though Harris County had obtained prior clearance from the Office of the Texas Secretary of State (which is led by a Republican appointed by Republican Governor Abbott) and had tested drive-in voting in the primary runoff elections in July without complaint. SCOTX denied the petition and drive-thru voting continued. On October 29 another action was filed seeking to invalidate drive-thru ballots based on the contention that this was a form of curbside voting that the Texas Election Code authorized only for voters with disabilities. In an order issued on Sunday, November 1, the Texas Supreme Court denied the petition challenging the legality of drive-through voting, but did not resolve the legal argument one way or the other. The next day, U.S. District Judge Andrew Hanen heard an almost identical case by the same group of plaintiff, which included Republican candidates, on an emergency basis. Slate described the judge as "one of the most notoriously partisan conservatives in the federal judiciary." Hanen ruled against the plaintiffs, dismissing their action for lack of standing, with the result that drive-in voting remained in effect. The Plaintiffs, which included Steve Toth, immediately sought emergency relief in the Fifth Circuit Court of Appeals, but were unsuccessful. Hollins nevertheless cancelled drive-thru voting in tent structures on the eve of Election Day. He reversed himself out of concern that ballots cast there might be declared invalid, should the Fifth Circuit disagree with Judge Hanen on the standing issue and agree with Judge Hanen that tents were not permissible polling places on Election Day. 

Some counties also set up an online system that allowed voters to check for wait times at early voting centers and make their voting plans accordingly. 

On October 5, Texas Governor Greg Abbott issued a proclamation under the Texas Disaster Act limiting each county to a single drop-off location for mail ballots. Federal judge Robert Pitman blocked Abbott's order on October 9. The next day, Texas Attorney General Ken Paxton appealed to the Fifth Circuit Court of Appeals for an emergency stay of Pitman's ruling, which a three-judge motion panel temporarily granted on an interim basis, pending consideration of the appeal on the merits. A Texas state judge also blocked Abbott's order on October 15, and a state appeals court upheld that decision on October 23. Attorney General Ken Paxton then sought emergency relief from the Texas Supreme Court, which backed the Governor and lifted the temporary injunction in an October 27 decision with no dissent.

Turnout
Voter registration in Texas ended on October 5, and the Secretary of State reported a registration total of 16,955,519 voters, an increase of 1,854,432 since the 2016 elections, and 1.2 million of which had occurred after the 2018 midterm elections. 

Early voting began on October 13. Over one million ballots were received on that day, and by October 15 fewer than two million ballots were counted. The following day the count was 2.6 million, which meant 15.51% of the state's registered voters had already voted.

For the whole early voting period, votes in the age 18-29 range were higher than the total of that age group of 2016, with 1.3 million votes.

On October 13, Dallas County recorded 59,905 ballots and Tarrant County recorded 42,428 ballots, with the former setting a record for that county and the latter below the 2016 count on the first day of early voting.

On October 13, Harris County had an unofficial tally of 128,186 ballots received, the highest ever first day early voting count and over 5% of the county's registered voters. By the second day the count was 287,931, 11% of the county's registered voters. On the third day over 100,000 ballots were counted, and in those three days 387,000 ballots were counted, with 44,000 of them issued through the mail. On the fourth day a similar number of ballots were cast, which meant the number of ballots cast total was about 500,000. On October 23 there were 1 million ballots cast from Harris County.

On October 13, Travis County received 35,873 ballots, while it received 38,119 the following day, and by 3 P.M. on Thursday over 26,000. When voting closed on Thursday the percentage of Travis County voters who had already voted was 16.44%. On Friday 41,328 additional votes were counted. Williamson County by the third day had a 64,891 votes out of 376,931 people registered to vote, which meant its turnout was already 17.25%.

On October 13, Bexar County recorded 78,000 votes, with over 45,000 by mail and the remainder in person.

On October 13, El Paso County recorded fewer than 34,000 votes.

By October 19, Texas voters cast 50% of the votes cast in the 2016 presidential election in Texas. By October 22, 65.5% of 2016 votes were cast (or 34.65% of registered voters). By October 25, over 80% of 2016 votes were cast (or 43% of registered voters), and by October 29, 50% of registered voters had cast ballots by early in-person and absentee ballot. By October 30, statewide voter turnout, as well as turnout in Harris County, had already surpassed the total of 2016.

General results

Results by county

Counties that flipped from Democratic to Republican
Frio (largest municipality: Pearsall)
Jim Wells (largest municipality: Alice)
Kenedy (largest municipality: Sarita)
Kleberg (largest municipality: Kingsville)
La Salle (largest municipality: Cotulla)
Reeves (largest municipality: Pecos)
Val Verde (largest municipality: Del Rio)
Zapata (largest municipality: Zapata)

Counties that flipped from Republican to Democratic
Hays (largest municipality: San Marcos) 
Tarrant (largest municipality: Fort Worth)
Williamson (largest municipality: Round Rock)

Results by congressional district
Trump won 22 out of the 36 congressional districts in Texas, while Biden won 14, including one held by a Republican.

Analysis
While Biden still won Latino voters in Texas with 58% and Latinos of Mexican heritage with 63%, Trump significantly improved his numbers among Hispanic voters in the state, particularly in the Rio Grande Valley. Trump flipped Jim Wells County and La Salle County which had not voted Republican since 1972. He also flipped Frio County, Kleberg County, Reeves County, Val Verde County, and Kenedy County; the first 4 having last voted Republican in 2004 and the last having last voted Republican in 2012. He also became the first Republican to win Zapata County since Warren G. Harding in 1920, flipping it by five points after having lost it by 33 points in 2016. Trump's total of eight counties flipped in South Texas were the most flipped by any candidate in any state in 2020 and he flipped more counties in South Texas than he did in the rest of the nation combined.

Biden greatly outperformed Clinton in Greater Austin, which was a major contributor to Trump's relatively weak performance statewide. He flipped Hays County and Williamson County, both of them suburban counties located outside of the state capital that had not been won by a Democrat since 1992 and 1976, respectively. This is also the first election since 1956 when the latter voted for the statewide loser. Biden also became the first Democratic candidate to garner at least 50,000 votes in Bell County, a county just outside of Greater Austin and had the center of Texas population within it in the 2010 census. At 44.76%, he outperformed Obama's record for the highest percentage of votes a Democrat presidential nominee received at Bell County since 1976, the last time Bell County voted for a Democrat. Also, Biden became the first Democrat to ever win the White House without Jefferson County. Biden also became the first Democrat to win without Frio County since it was formed in 1871, the first to win without La Salle County since it was formed in 1880, the first to win without Reeves County since it was formed in 1883, the first to win without Val Verde County since it was formed in 1885, the first to win without Jim Wells County since it founded in 1911, the first to win without Kleberg County since it was founded in 1913, and the first Democrat to win the White House without winning Zapata County since Woodrow Wilson in 1916. Because of Trump's strong gains in heavily Hispanic areas, Biden's best performance in Texas came not from the southern border region, but Travis County, encompassing the college-educated, cosmopolitan, liberal bastion of Austin, home to the University of Texas at Austin, where he won the highest percentage for a Democrat since Harry S. Truman in 1948.

Biden also improved throughout the three largest metropolitan areas in Texas. While not significantly outperforming Clinton in Harris and Bexar Counties, he did make considerable inroads into their surrounding suburbs, thus eking out narrow wins in Greater Houston and Greater San Antonio, the first time a Democratic Presidential candidate has accomplished such a feat in the 21st Century. However, in the former, gains were incredibly mixed. Trump saw substantial growth in Houston's North and East, home to large concentrations of Latinos. He also improved in diverse Alief along Harris County's southwest border, which is heavily Hispanic and Asian. Biden, on the other hand, continued Clinton's gains in the wealthy college-educated "Houston Arrow" suburbs in the city's west, though his improvements were significantly smaller. 

Perhaps the biggest reason for Biden narrowing the Lone Star State's margin of victory was the surge of Democratic support in the Dallas-Fort Worth Metroplex, the largest metropolitan area in the state, which he also narrowly won. He scored nearly 65% of the vote in Dallas County, the highest percentage won by a Democrat since 1940. Additionally, Biden narrowly flipped Tarrant County, winning by fewer than 2,000 votes. Tarrant County is home to the fifth-largest city in Texas, Fort Worth, and had not been won by a Democrat since 1964, when favorite son Lyndon B. Johnson carried it. His growth in the deeply Republican Fort Worth suburbs, which historically kept Democratic candidates from capturing Tarrant, was a key factor in not just winning the county but the Metroplex as a whole. Biden improved substantially in the large DFW suburbs of Collin County and Denton County, which have rapidly grown and diversified in the past decade, narrowing Trump's margin of victories from 16.57% and 20% in 2016, down to 4.37% and 8.08%, respectively. Both of their county seats (the two suburban cities of McKinney and Denton, respectively) have trended leftward since 2016 due to the influx of younger professionals and families in the past decade, which shifted to the Democrats in this election. Biden also won the city of Plano, the largest city in Collin County, and narrowly won the city of Allen.

Dianne Solis et al. of The Dallas Morning News stated that according to polls "Democrat Joe Biden overwhelmingly won the Latino vote in Texas' urban areas". In the historically Democratic Rio Grande Valley, Biden's lead significantly narrowed from 2016.

See also
 United States presidential elections in Texas
 Voter suppression in the United States 2019–2020: Texas
 2020 Texas elections
 2020 United States presidential election
 2020 Democratic Party presidential primaries
 2020 Republican Party presidential primaries
 2020 United States elections

Notes
Partisan clients

Samples

References

Further reading
 
 
 
 . (Describes bellwether Collin County, Texas)
  - Opinion piece

External links
Elections Division at the Texas Secretary of State official website

 
 
 
  (state affiliate of the U.S. League of Women Voters)

Texas
2020
Presidential